The Kentucky Museum is a history, arts, and culture museum located at 1444 Kentucky Street, Bowling Green, Kentucky on the campus of Western Kentucky University. It includes 80,000 square feet of exhibit space.

Archaeology, art, clothing and textiles, furniture, glassware ceramics,  quilts, toys and games, and the newly opened "Instruments of American Excellence" collections are all permanent exhibits at the museum.

Description

Permanent exhibits include the Instruments of American Excellence (IAE) (opened September 2012), the life of Duncan Hines, a look at the Civil War from a local perspective, a decorative arts gallery ranging from an Egyptian sarcophagus to 1970s macramé, plus a gallery of regional quilts.  Changing galleries display a variety of themes, with community exhibitions, university-class designed and installed exhibitions, and some annual events, like the open art show. In addition, the 1815 Log House displays building techniques, furniture, tools, and clothing authentic to the 1810s time period. Hands-on programs for school classes and educational workshops for adults, lectures, and festivals are also regularly featured at the Kentucky Museum.

The IAE exhibit is unique among museums: its purpose was to collect the ordinary means by which Americans have achieved extraordinary things: the actual tools or instruments that have helped change the course of our nation's history. The IAE includes items that belonged to Madeleine Albright, Daniel Boone, Jimmy Carter, Tony Hawk, Roger Ingram, Helen Keller, Liza Minnelli and many more.

External links
 Kentucky Museum website
 Kentucky Tourism website
 Tools of Excellence in Bowling Green Daily News
 WKU to feature iconic American items in exhibit in WKU Herald
 Bowling Green Love Letter in Huffington Post
 Interview: Kentucky Museum exhibit at WHAS11.com

Museums in Bowling Green, Kentucky
Western Kentucky University
History museums in Kentucky
Art museums and galleries in Kentucky
University museums in Kentucky